Émile-Jacques Gilbert (3 September 1795 – 31 October 1874) was a 19th-century French architect.

In 1838 Gilbert was commissioned to reconstruct the hospital for the insane at Charenton along modern more humane lines recommended by Jean-Étienne Dominique Esquirol; the new structure was completed in 1845. In 1843 Gilbert, as Architect of the City of Paris, was commissioned to erect the first of the model penitentiaries following designs of Guillaume-Abel Blouet, the Mazas Prison, in Paris. In 1858 he was commissioned to build the new Hôtel Dieu opposite Notre Dame on the Île de la Cité, Paris.

References

19th-century French architects
1795 births
1874 deaths
Architects from Paris
École des Beaux-Arts alumni
Academic staff of the École des Beaux-Arts
Members of the Académie des beaux-arts
Prix de Rome for architecture